Antonio Bachour (1975 in Rio Grande, Puerto Rico) is a Puerto Rican pastry chef. In 2011, he was named one of the ten best pastry chefs in America, and subsequently won the 2012 Zest Award for Baking & Pastry Innovator after having been nominated for the 2011 award. Zagat has described him as a "confection master".

Life and education 
Bachour is a graduate of Johnson & Wales University, and has studied at the Valrhona cooking school

Career 
Bachour has served as a judge in the 2013 US Pastry Competition and the Chicago Restaurant Pastry Competition, and as a guest chef at the 2013 Friends of James Beard dinner, held by the James Beard Foundation.

In 2013, he published his first cookbook.

References

1975 births
Living people
Johnson & Wales University alumni
People from Río Grande, Puerto Rico
Puerto Rican chefs
Pastry chefs
American people of Lebanese descent
American people of Syrian descent